Kazimierz Sapieha may refer to:
 Aleksander Kazimierz Sapieha (1624–1671), Polish nobleman. He became bishop of Samogitia in 1660 and of Vilnius in 1667
  (born 1739)
 Jan Kazimierz Sapieha the Elder (died 1730), Grand Hetman of Lithuania
 Jan Kazimierz Sapieha the Younger (1637–1720/1642–1720), Lithuanian nobleman
 Kazimierz Leon Sapieha (1609–1656), nobleman of the Grand Duchy of Lithuania
  (born 1654)
  (born 1639)
 Kazimierz Nestor Sapieha (1757–1798), Polish-Lithuanian noble (szlachcic) and one of the creators of the 3 May Constitution
  (born 1703)
  (born 1654)

See also 
 Kazimierz Lew Sapieha